Krisztián Tölgyesi (born 27 June 1975) is a Hungarian judoka. He competed in the men's half-middleweight event at the 2000 Summer Olympics.

References

1975 births
Living people
Hungarian male judoka
Olympic judoka of Hungary
Judoka at the 2000 Summer Olympics
Martial artists from Budapest